Levona P Lewis (born 15 November 1972) is a South African former cricketer who played as a left-arm medium bowler. She appeared in nine One Day Internationals for South Africa in 1999 and 2000. She played domestic cricket for Western Province.

References

External links
 
 

1972 births
Living people
South African women cricketers
South Africa women One Day International cricketers
Western Province women cricketers